Hendrick Zuck (born 21 July 1990) is a German professional footballer who plays as a left winger for 1. FC Kaiserslautern.

Club career

Early career
Zuck began his career at SC Großrosseln in 1992, where he was managed by his father. In 2004, he moved to Borussia Neunkirchen in the Oberliga Südwest, where he played for the youth team, before being promoted to the senior team. Zuck made his debut on 5 August 2008, coming on as a substitute in a 2–0 home loss against FC 08 Homburg. He scored his first goal on 8 April 2009 in a 4–1 away win against TuS Mechtersheim.

1. FC Kaiserslautern
On 23 May 2010, Zuck joined 1. FC Kaiserslautern on a free transfer. He was placed in the club's reserve team. During the beginning of the 2012–13 season, Zuck was promoted to the club's senior team, where he signed his first professional contract, a two-year deal until June 2014. He made his debut on 6 August 2012 in a 3–3 home draw against 1. FC Union Berlin, where he scored the club's third goal, giving Kaiserslautern a 3–2 lead, before Marc Pfertzel equalised in injury time for Union Berlin.

SC Freiburg
During the winter break of the 2012–13 season, Zuck transferred to Bundesliga side SC Freiburg.

Eintracht Braunschweig
On 11 June 2014, it was announced that Zuck would join Eintracht Braunschweig on a one-year loan deal for the 2014–15 2. Bundesliga season. The loan deal was made permanent in May 2015.

Return to 1. FC Kaiserslautern
In May 2018, 1. FC Kaiserslautern announced Zuck would return to the club for the 2018–19 season having agreed a contract until 2021.

Career statistics

Club

Notes

References

External links
 

1990 births
Living people
People from Püttlingen
German footballers
Association football midfielders
Bundesliga players
2. Bundesliga players
1. FC Kaiserslautern players
1. FC Kaiserslautern II players
SC Freiburg players
Eintracht Braunschweig players
Borussia Neunkirchen players
3. Liga players
Footballers from Saarland